This list of Wizards of the Coast products includes games and other products published by Wizards of the Coast as an independent developer and publisher, and any of its subsidiaries, its computer and video game divisions, and later as a brand of Hasbro.

Games and products

Board games
A board game is a tabletop game that involves counters or  moved or placed on a pre-marked surface or "board", according to a set of rules.
 Axis & Allies (Revised Edition), as well as D-Day, Europe, Pacific, and Battle of the Bulge spinoffs
 Betrayal at House on the Hill
 Diplomacy
 Lords of Waterdeep
 Monsters Menace America
 Magic the Gathering: Arena of the Planeswalkers
 Nexus Ops
 Risk 2210 A.D. and Risk Godstorm
 RoboRally
 Vegas Showdown

Collectible card games

 BattleTech Trading Card Game
 C-23
 Codename: Kids Next Door
 Duel Masters Trading Card Game
 Dune
 Harry Potter Trading Card Game
 Hecatomb
 Hercules: The Legendary Journeys
 Magic: The Gathering
 MLB Showdown
 NBA Showdown
 Neopets Trading Card Game
 Netrunner
 NFL Showdown
 Pokémon Trading Card Game (publishing right transferred back to Nintendo in 2003)
 The Simpsons Trading Card Game
 Star Sisterz
 Star Wars: The Trading Card Game
 WCW NITRO Trading Card Game
 Vampire: The Eternal Struggle (previously Jyhad)
 Xena: Warrior Princess
 Xiaolin Showdown Trading Card Game

Miniature games
 Axis & Allies Miniatures
 Dreamblade
 Dungeons & Dragons Miniatures Game
 Star Wars Miniatures
 Heroscape

Online games
 Magic: The Gathering Online
 Magic Duels
 Magic: The Gathering Arena

Role-playing games and supplements

 Alternity (defunct line, acquired in the TSR buyout)
 Ars Magica 3rd edition supplements only.
 d20 Modern
 d20 system
 Dungeons & Dragons (acquired in the TSR buyout)
 Everway
 Gamma World
 Marvel Super Heroes Adventure Game (acquired in the TSR buyout)
 Star Wars Roleplaying Game
 The Primal Order

Wizards of the Coast drafted the Open Game License used by Open Gaming Foundation and the d20 system.

Standalone card games
 Alpha Blitz
 Filthy Rich (game)
 Guillotine
 Pivot
 The Great Dalmuti and Corporate Shuffle (a Dilbert-themed edition; it is not functionally identical, however. See The Great Dalmuti for detail on the differences.)
 Three-Dragon Ante

Fantasy novel series
Wizards of the Coast also publishes many fantasy novel series based on its other game products. Some of these are now out-of-print.

 Dragonlance
 Eberron
 Forgotten Realms
 Greyhawk
 Legend of the Five Rings
 Magic: The Gathering (since 1998)
 Planescape
 Ravenloft

Wizards also has a juvenile publishing imprint, Mirrorstone Books, which has produced books for StarSisterz, Dragonlance: The New Adventures and Knights of the Silver Dragon.

References

Wizards of the Coast
Wizards of the Coast products
Wizards of the Coast